Gerald 'Jerry' H. Moss is a retired American tennis player.

Career
Moss was the National Boys Under 18 Champion in 1951.

In 1955 Moss was runner-up at the U.S. National Championships men's doubles title at the Longwood Cricket Club in Boston with compatriot Bill Quillian after a five-set defeat to Japanese Kosei Kamo and Atsushi Miyagi. Hurricane Diane roared through New England in August 1955, flooding the tennis courts and delaying the tournament for a week. When the tournament resumed many of the leading players such as Ken Rosewall, Tony Trabert, Lew Hoad and Vic Seixas had already left which devalued the men's doubles draw.

In 1954 he reached the third round of the U.S. National Championships men's singles and was beaten by Australian legend Ken Rosewall. He equaled his best Grand Slam singles performance in 1956 and 1960.

In 1992 Moss was inducted into the University of Miami Sports Hall of Fame.

Grand Slam finals

Doubles (1 runner-up)

References

External links
 

American male tennis players
Tennis people from Florida
Miami Hurricanes men's tennis players
Living people
Year of birth missing (living people)